MMMBop: The Collection is a 2005 compilation album by Hanson on the Spectrum label, owned by Universal Records. Released in Europe, it is composed of 17 previously released tracks from the albums Middle of Nowhere, Snowed In, Live from Albertane and This Time Around.

The compilation garnered some controversy due to its release around the time of Hanson's documentary "Strong Enough to Break," which chronicled the troubles Hanson encountered in trying to release their third album before leaving Island (Hanson's former label Mercury had been merged into Island, which is owned by Universal, the distributor of this compilation.)

Track listing
 "MMMBop" (I. Hanson, T. Hanson, Z. Hanson) - 4:29 from Middle of Nowhere
 "Where's the Love" (I. Hanson, T. Hanson, Z. Hanson) - 4:14 from Middle of Nowhere
 "I Will Come to You" (I. Hanson, T. Hanson, Z. Hanson, Barry Mann, Cynthia Weil) - 4:12 from Middle of Nowhere
 "Weird" (I. Hanson, T. Hanson, Z. Hanson, Desmond Child) - 4:03 from Middle of Nowhere
 "Thinking of You" (I. Hanson, T. Hanson, Z. Hanson) - 3:15 from Middle of Nowhere
 "If Only" (I. Hanson, T. Hanson, Z. Hanson) - 4:32 from This Time Around
 "Smile" (I. Hanson, T. Hanson, Z. Hanson) - 3:18 from This Time Around
 "Gimme Some Lovin'/Shake A Tail Feather" [Live] (Steve Winwood, Spencer Davis, Muff Winwood/Otha Hayes, Verlie Rice, Andre Williams) - 5:08 from Live from Albertane
 "Money (That's What I Want)" [Live] (Janie Bradford, Berry Gordy) - 2:16 from Live from Albertane
 "Man From Milwaukee" (I. Hanson, T. Hanson, Z. Hanson) - 3:40 from  Middle of Nowhere
 "Cried" (I. Hanson, T. Hanson, Z. Hanson, Mark Hudson) - 3:35 [mis-labeled as "Cry"] B-Side from I Will Come to You single
 "Can't Stop" (I. Hanson, T. Hanson, Z. Hanson) - 4:27 from This Time Around
 "Sure About It" (I. Hanson, T. Hanson, Z. Hanson) - 3:29 from This Time Around
 "This Time Around" (I. Hanson, T. Hanson, Z. Hanson) - 4:19 from This Time Around
 "Little Saint Nick" (Brian Wilson, Mike Love) - 3:35 from Snowed In
 "Merry Christmas Baby" (Lou Baxter, Johnny Moore) - 3:14 from Snowed In
 "If Only" (JFP Club Mix) (I. Hanson, T. Hanson, Z. Hanson) - 5:56 Previously unreleased

2005 greatest hits albums
Hanson (band) albums